Edward le Despenser, 1st Baron Despenser  (24 March 1336, Essendine – 11 November 1375) was the son of another Edward le Despenser and Anne Ferrers, sister of Henry, Lord Ferrers of Groby. He succeeded as Lord of Glamorgan in 1349.

Le Despencer went with Edward the Black Prince to France, and was present at the Battle of Poitiers. In recognition of his conduct in the French wars, he was summoned to Parliament as a baron in 1357. At the same time, he also became a Knight of the Garter.

He was a friend and patron of Jean Froissart and the eldest brother of Henry le Despenser, Bishop of Norwich.

There is a statue of him on the top of the Holy Trinity Chantry Chapel in Tewkesbury Abbey, renowned as the "KNEELING KNIGHT".

Family
Edward married Elizabeth de Burghersh, daughter of Bartholomew de Burghersh, 2nd Baron Burghersh. They had the following children:
 Margaret Le Despencer (died 3 November 1415), married Robert de Ferrers, 5th Baron Ferrers of Chartley. They were ancestors to Queen Catherine Parr.
 Elizabeth le Despenser (died 10 or 11 April 1408) married (1) John FitzAlan, 2nd Baron Arundel (30 November 1364 – 14 August 1390) (2) William la Zouche, 3rd Baron Zouche
 Thomas le Despenser, 1st Earl of Gloucester (22 September 1373 – 13 January 1400), married Constance of York.
 Hugh Despencer
 Cicely Despencer
 Anne Despencer (died 30 October 1426) married (1) Hugh de Hastings and (2) Thomas de Morley, 4th Baron Morley

Notes

References
Burke, Sir Bernard. "Despencer-Barons Despencer, Earl of Gloucester." A Genealogical History of the Dormant, Abeyant, Forfeited, and Extinct Peerages, of the British Empire. London: Wm Clowes and Sons, Ltd., 1962. (p. 167).
Burke, John. A General and Heraldic Dictionary of the Peerages of England, Ireland, and Scotland, Extinct, Dormant, and in Abeyance. London: H. Colburn and R. Bentley, 1831. (pp. 173–4) googlebooks Retrieved May 26, 2008
Weis, Frederick Lewis, Walter Lee Sheppard, David Faris, and Frederick Lewis Weis. Ancestral Roots of Certain American Colonists Who Came to America Before 1700: The Lineage of Alfred the Great, Charlemagne, Malcolm of Scotland, Robert the Strong, and Some of Their Descendants. (7th Ed.) Baltimore, Md: Genealogical Pub. Co, 1992.  (pp. 73–74, Lines: 70–35, 70–36, 74–34, 212–34.) googlebooks Retrieved May 26, 2008

1330s births
1375 deaths
14th-century English nobility
Barons le Despencer
Peers created by Edward III
Garter Knights appointed by Edward III
Edward
Burials at Tewkesbury Abbey
Lords of Glamorgan
People of the Hundred Years' War